Thomas Mayo (born February 13, 1990) is an American gridiron football wide receiver for the Shreveport team of the American Patriot League (APL). He was signed as an undrafted free agent by the Oakland Raiders in 2012. He played college football at California University of Pennsylvania.

College career
In his junior season at Concord University, he was selected to the preseason Consensus Draft Services (CDS) First-team All-American team. In his senior season at California (PA), he was selected for the AP Second-team All-American following the conclusion of his senior season. On January 24, 2011, he was selected to the Don Hansen First-team All-American team while at Concord University. On January 19, 2012, he was named to the D2Football.com First-team All-American. He also was selected to the Daktronics First-team All-American, and Daktronics First-team All-Region. He was selected to the All-PSAC West First-team, preseason Sporting News All-American, preseason Lindy's First-team All-American, preseason D2Football.com Second-team All-American.

Professional career

Oakland Raiders
On May 4, 2012, he signed with the Oakland Raiders as an undrafted free agent. On August 27, 2012, he was released.

Chicago Rush
On December 3, 2012, he signed with the Chicago Rush of the Arena Football League.

New York Jets
He was signed by the New York Jets on March 1, 2013. He was waived on May 7, 2013. He was re-signed five days later. Mayo was released on July 23, 2013 and later reverted to the team's injured reserve list. He was waived from the injured reserved list with an injury settlement on July 25, 2013.

Spokane Shock
On September 11, 2013, he signed with the Spokane Shock of the Arena Football League.

Tri-Cities Fever
Mayo signed with the Tri-Cities Fever of the Indoor Football League (IFL). After two games of the regular season, Mayo was released to attend the 2015 NFL Veteran Combine.

Nebraska Danger
On June 4, 2015, Mayo signed with the Nebraska Danger. Mayo was released on May 4, 2016.

Winnipeg Blue Bombers
Mayo was with the Winnipeg Blue Bombers of the Canadian Football League during the 2016 training camp.

Saskatchewan Roughriders
In 2017, Mayo had a stint with the Saskatchewan Roughriders.

Montreal Alouettes

American Patriot League
In 2022, Mayo was selected by the Shreveport team of the American Patriot League (APL), scheduled to begin play in 2023.

Personal life
He is the son of Thomas Mayo, Jr. and Leslie Mayo.

References

External links
California (PA) bio 
New York Jets bio 
Spokane Shock bio

1990 births
Living people
Oakland Raiders players
Chicago Rush players
New York Jets players
Spokane Shock players
Tri-Cities Fever players
Nebraska Danger players
Players of American football from Virginia
People from Reston, Virginia
Winnipeg Blue Bombers players
Saskatchewan Roughriders players
Montreal Alouettes players